Eluxadoline, sold under the brand names Viberzi and Truberzi, is a medication taken by mouth for the treatment of diarrhea and abdominal pain in individuals with diarrhea-predominant irritable bowel syndrome (IBS-D). It was approved for use in the United States in 2015. The drug originated from Janssen Pharmaceutica and was developed by Actavis.

Contraindications
This drug is contraindicated in case of having:
 Blockage of the gallbladder or a sphincter of Oddi problem
 Problems with excessive alcohol use
 Pancreatitis
 Liver problems
 Chronic or severe constipation

Adverse effects
Common adverse effects are constipation and nausea, but rates of discontinuation due to constipation were low for both eluxadoline and placebo. Rare adverse effects: fatigue, bronchitis, viral gastroenteritis.
Rare serious adverse effects include pancreatitis with a general incidence of 0.3% - higher incidence with 100 mg dose (0.3%) than with 75 mg dose (0.2%). The risk is even greater in those who do not have a gall bladder and the medication is not recommended in this group.

In March 2017, the U.S. Food and Drug Administration issued a safety alert for eluxadoline concerning an increased risk of serious pancreatitis in patients without a gallbladder. An FDA review found that in such patients, spasm of the sphincter of Oddi may lead to severe pancreatitis. The FDA reported that in some cases symptoms have occurred with just one or two doses at the recommended dosage for patients without a gallbladder (75 mg). Of two deaths associated with eluxadoline reported up to February 2017, both occurred in patients without a gallbladder.

Interactions 

Elevated concentrations of eluxadoline were observed with co-administration of inhibitors of the transporter protein OATP1B1, such as:
 Cyclosporine
 Gemfibrozil
 Certain antiretrovirals
 Rifampin
 Eltrombopag

Also, concurrent use of other drugs that cause constipation is not preferred, such as:
 Opioids
 Alosetron
 Anticholinergics
 Bismuth subsalicylate, potentially dangerous synergism.

Eluxadoline increases the concentrations of drugs which are OATP1B1 and BCRP substrates. Also, co-administration of eluxadoline with rosuvastatin may increase the risk of rhabdomyolysis.

Pharmacology

Mechanism of action
Eluxadoline is a μ- and κ-opioid receptor agonist and δ-opioid receptor antagonist that acts locally in the enteric nervous system, possibly decreasing adverse effects on the central nervous system.

Pharmacokinetics
In the in vitro studies, eluxadoline was found to be transported by OAT3 (SLC22A8), OATP1B1 (SLCO1B1) and BSEP (ABCB11) at the highest concentrations tested (400 ng/ml which is 162-fold larger than the observed Cmax of the highest therapeutic dose of 100 mg).  However, it was not to be transported by OCT1 POU2F1, OAT1 Organic anion transporter 1, OCT2, OATP1B3 (SLCO1B3), P-gp (P-glycoprotein), or BCRP (ABCG2).

Multidrug resistance-associated protein 2 (MRP2)-vesicular accumulation of eluxadoline was observed, indicating that the drug is a substrate of MRP2. Eluxadoline was not found to inhibit BCRP-, BSEP-, MRP2-, OCT1-, OCT2-, OAT1-, OAT3-, or OATP1B3-mediated transport of probe substrates but inhibited the transport of probe substrates of OATP1B1 and P-gp. Also in the in vitro studies, it was observed that eluxadoline is an in vivo substrate of OATP1B1, OAT3, and MRP2. Finally, no inhibition or induction of cytochrome P450 enzymes was observed.

Following a 100 mg dose of eluxadoline, the Cmax was about 2 to 4 ng/ml and AUC was 12-22 ng.h/ml. Eluxadoline has linear pharmacokinetics with no accumulation upon repeated twice daily dosing. Taking eluxadoline with high fat meal decreased the Cmax by 50% and AUC by 60%.

Chemistry

Synthesis
The synthesis of eluxadoline was extensively discussed in the patent No. WO2006099060 A2, with the title : "Process for the preparation of opioid modulators" which was published in Sept. 2006

See also 
 Asimadoline
 Axelopran
 Difenoxin
 Diphenoxylate
 Loperamide

References 

Amines
Antidiarrhoeals
Carbamates
Delta-opioid receptor antagonists
Diarrhea
Imidazoles
AbbVie brands
Janssen Pharmaceutica
Kappa-opioid receptor agonists
Mu-opioid receptor agonists
Peripherally selective drugs